Chad Everett Gilbert (born March 9, 1981) is an American musician and record producer. He is best known as a founding member of the rock band New Found Glory, for whom he plays lead guitar, sings backing vocals, and composes music. He was also the lead vocalist for the band's now-defunct side-project, International Superheroes of Hardcore. Additionally, Gilbert was the vocalist for the hardcore punk band Shai Hulud between 1995 and 1998, and from 2012 to 2013.

Gilbert has produced records, notably H2O's Nothing to Prove and A Day to Remember's albums, Homesick, What Separates Me from You and Common Courtesy. In 2010, Gilbert announced he would release solo material online, free of charge, and has released several demos and 7" vinyl records under the name What's Eating Gilbert.

Early life
Chad Everett Gilbert was born on March 9, 1981, in Coral Springs, Florida. He attended J. P. Taravella High School, but left after the 11th-grade after New Found Glory got signed to California-based record label Drive-Thru Records.

Personal life
Gilbert married Sherri DuPree of the rock band Eisley in February 2007, and divorced later in the year. He also married Paramore's lead vocalist and keyboardist Hayley Williams from February 2016 until they divorced in 2017 due to infidelity on Gilbert's part. Gilbert married Lisa Cimorelli, member of the all-sisters singing group Cimorelli, on October 3, 2020. They have a daughter, Lily, born July 17, 2021. 

On January 26, 2010, Gilbert reported that "suspicious cells" had been found in his thyroid and he would be getting half of his thyroid surgically removed. Four days later, Gilbert posted on his Twitter that the surgery had been a success and no cancer had been found.

On December 19, 2021, Gilbert reported that he underwent emergency surgery at the ICU to remove a rare cancerous tumor called a pheochromocytoma after he was found unresponsive in his bed at home.

On August 15, 2022, Gilbert reported that he had been diagnosed with cancer again and would undergo surgery the following day after another pheochromocytoma tumor was discovered in his spine.

On February 11, 2023, Gilbert reported that he had been diagnosed with cancer again and would undergo intense chemotherapy after another pheochromocytoma tumor was discovered in his lungs and back.

Discography

With Shai Hulud

Profound Hatred of Man (1997)
Hearts Once Nourished with Hope and Compassion (1997)
Fall of Every Man - split with Indecision (1998)
Reach Beyond the Sun (2013)

With New Found Glory

 Nothing Gold Can Stay (1999)
 New Found Glory (2000)
 Sticks and Stones (2002)
 Catalyst (2004)
 Coming Home (2006)
 Not Without a Fight (2009)
 Radiosurgery'. (2011)
 Resurrection (2014)
 Makes Me Sick (2017)
 Forever and Ever x Infinity (2020)

With International Superheroes of HardcoreTakin' it Ova! (2008)HPxHC (EP) (2008)

With What's Eating GilbertDear God (2010)Thinkin' Bout Her (2010)What I'd Do (2010)Nashville Sessions (2012)Cheap Shots (2012)Solid Gold Hits (compilation of the four previous 7" vinyl EPs) (2013)That New Sound You're Looking For (2015)

With Hazen StreetHazen Street (2004)

Production credits
2008: H2O – Nothing to Prove2009: A Day to Remember – Homesick2009: Fireworks – All I Have to Offer Is My Own Confusion2010: The Dear & Departed – Chapters2010: Terror – Keepers of the Faith2010: A Day to Remember – What Separates Me from You2011: This Time Next Year – Drop Out of Life2011: Trapped Under Ice – Big Kiss Goodnight2012: Candy Hearts – The Best Ways to Disappear2012: Set Your Goals
2012: Shai Hulud – Reach Beyond the Sun2013: Lisa Loeb – No Fairy Tale (album)
2013: State Champs – The Finer Things2013: A Day to Remember – Common Courtesy2014: Candy Hearts – All the Ways You Let Me Down2015: H2O – Use Your VoiceCollaborations
Guest vocals on Fall Out Boy's "I Slept With Someone in Fall Out Boy and All I Got Was This Stupid Song Written About Me"
Guitar on Fall Out Boy's "The Take Over, the Breaks Over"
Guest vocals on Throwdown's "The Only Thing" from the album HaymakerGuest vocals on Set Your Goals' "Our Ethos: A Legacy to Pass On" from the album This Will Be the Death of UsGuest vocals on Say Anything's song "You're the Wanker, If Anyone Is" from the album In Defense of the GenreGuest vocals on Madball's song "My Armor" from the album Hardcore Lives''

See also
:Category:Song recordings produced by Chad Gilbert

References

External links
New Found Glory
Chad Gilbert

1981 births
21st-century American musicians
American rock musicians
American rock singers
Musicians from Florida
Musicians from Coral Springs, Florida
Pop punk musicians
Lead guitarists
Living people
A Day to Remember
Hopeless Records artists
American male guitarists
Morning Again members
Hazen Street members
New Found Glory members
Shai Hulud members
Tension (hardcore band) members